The 178th New York Infantry Regiment was an Infantry Regiment that served in the United States Army during the American Civil War. It was often referred to as the "Second Regiment, Hawkins Zouaves" (the first such regiment being the 9th New York Infantry Regiment).

Military service, 1863
The regiment was formed by consolidation of multiple earlier recruiting efforts (Blair Rifles, Pratt Guards, Seymour Light Infantry, Burnside Rifles, Westchester Light Infantry, Defenders) into one unit. All companies except one were recruited from New York City; Company A was recruited from Rochester, Buffalo, Niagara, and Kingston. Organization was completed in October, with some companies departing the state in June and September. The regiment was part of the Defenses of Washington in XXII Corps, then the Provost Guard. In November the regiment moved to Eastport, Mississippi, and in December became part of the XVI Corps.

Military service, 1864
Beginning in February, while still part of the XVI Corps, the regiment was engaged in Camden, Jackson, and as part of Sherman's Meridian campaign. It then participated in Nathaniel P. Banks' Red River campaign, taking part in multiple engagements (especially the Battle of Pleasant Hill). After that disastrous campaign, the regiment took part in engagements in Arkansas, Tennessee, and again in Mississippi.

Military service, 1865-6
The regiment was consolidated into a single battalion back in Eastport in February, fought in the spring Mobile campaign in Alabama, and mustered out of service on April 20, 1866, at Montgomery, Alabama, under the command of Lieutenant Colonel John B. Gandolfo.

Casualties
The regiment suffered the following casualties during its service.
 Killed In Action: 0 Officers, 9 Enlisted
 Died of Wounds: 0 Officers, 9 Enlisted
 Died of Disease and other causes: 2 Officers, 190 Enlisted (35 Died as POW's)
 Total: 2 Officers and 208 Enlisted.

Commanding officers

 Lieutenant Colonel John B. Gandolfo

See also
 List of New York Civil War regiments
 New York State Military Museum and Veterans Research Center - Civil War - 178th Infantry Regiment History, photographs, historical sketch, table of battles and casualties, and Civil War newspaper clippings, for the 178th New York Volunteer Infantry Regiment.

References

Sources
 Phisterer, Frederick; “New York in the War of the Rebellion.” 3rd Edition, Albany, New York, J.B. Lyon Company, 1912.
 “'Annual Report of the Adjutant General of the State of New York. For the Year 1899.” James B. Lyon State Printers, Albany, New York, 1900.
 Volume II, "The Union Army: A History of Military Affairs in the loyal States, 1861-1865. Records of the Regiments in the Union Army, Cyclopedia of Battles, Memoirs of Commanders and Soldiers.” Federal Publishing Company, Madison, Wisconsin, 1908.
 Volume VI, “A Record of the Commissioned Officers, Non Commissioned Officers and Privates, of the Regiments which were organized in the State of New York, and called into the service of the United States to Assist in Suppressing the Rebellion caused by the secession of some of the Southern States from the Union, A.D. 1861, as taken from the Muster-In Rolls on File in the Adjutant Generals Office, S.N.Y.” Weed, Parsons, and Company, Printers, Albany, New York, 1866.
 “Official Army Register of the Volunteer force of the United States Army for the years 1861, ’62, ’63, ’64, ’65.” Adjutant Generals Office, United States Army, 1865 to 1867.

Infantry 178
1863 establishments in New York (state)
Military units and formations established in 1863
Military units and formations disestablished in 1866